To. Day is the second EP of South Korean girl group Fromis 9. The EP was released on June 5, 2018 by Stone Music. The physical version of the EP is available in two versions: "D-1" and "D-Day". Both of them consist of the same six songs, including the lead single, "DKDK ". Member Jang Gyu-ri was not involved in the EP due to her participation in Produce 48.

Track listing

Charts

Release history

Notes

References

2018 EPs
Fromis 9 EPs
Korean-language EPs
Hybe Corporation EPs